Zuber Kamal Khan (born 21 March 1989), professionally known as Zuber K. Khan, is an Indian model and actor who appears in Hindi films. He made his debut with Lekar Hum Deewana Dil, which was released on 4 July 2014.

He won Raymond model of the year. He followed that with Mr India Best Model Worldwide 2012. He stepped into acting after acting in theatre under Habib Tanvir. In 2011 Zuber finished his first commercial.

His film breakthrough came in 2014 with the film Lekar Hum Deewana Dil.

Career
In 2014, Khan appeared in Lekar Hum Deewana Dil. He served in the Indian Army. He then did commercials Panasonic, Tatamanza, Chocolate Room, Garnier, Telebrands, Aegon life insurance. His TV debut came on StarPlus in Iss Pyaar Ko Kya Naam Doon?. Zuber appeared on episodic shows on Sony, Zee TV StarPlus on shows such as Cid, Aahat, Fearfiles and Emotional Atyachar.

He played the main antagonist Muzzamik on Supercops vs Super Villains. Zuber debuted in daily soap opera with the  Kasam Tere Pyaar Ki as Manpreet Singh Bedi. 

Khan appeared on Naagin 3 as Ritivik, the paranormal activist.

Khan portrayed a psycho lover on Manmohini, which airs on Zee TV. 

Mirror-The reflection of life directed by Naveen Batra will be Khan's debut on the digital platform.

His film, Nyaay: The Justice which is based on the life of Sushant Singh Rajput was released on 11 June 2021 on the OTT platform "Lapalap Originals". He played the character of Mahendra Singh (based on Rajput) and Shreya Shukla played the role of Urvashi (based on Rhea Chakraborty) in the film. The film was directed by Dilip Gulati & produced by Vikas Productions.

Filmography

Television

References

External links
 

Indian male film actors
1989 births
Living people
21st-century Indian male actors
Male actors from Bhopal
Indian male television actors